Sara Cardin (born 27 January 1987) is an Italian karateka world champion at senior level at the World Karate Championships.

In 2021, she competed at the World Olympic Qualification Tournament held in Paris, France hoping to qualify for the 2020 Summer Olympics in Tokyo, Japan.

Achievements

References

External links
 Sara Cardin at Karate Records

1987 births
Living people
Italian female karateka
Karateka of Gruppo Sportivo Esercito
Competitors at the 2017 World Games
World Games medalists in karate
World Games bronze medalists
Mediterranean Games medalists in karate
Competitors at the 2009 Mediterranean Games
Competitors at the 2018 Mediterranean Games
Mediterranean Games silver medalists for Italy
20th-century Italian women
21st-century Italian women